Lecanora lecideopsis is a rare species of saxicolous (rock-dwelling), crustose lichen in the family Lecanoraceae. Known only from a single location in France (in the department of Hérault, municipality of Mons), it was formally described as new to science in 2019 by Claude Roux and Colther Coste. It grows on gneiss, a non-calcareous rock. It is named for its similarity with Lecanora lecideoides, from which it differs by its green to greenish-brown epithecium, its different chemistry, and its much narrower, oblong or long ellipsoid spores typically measuring 12–14, 4–16 by 3.5–4.0–4.5 μm.

See also
List of Lecanora species

References

lecideopsis
Lichen species
Lichens described in 2019
Lichens of Europe
Taxa named by Claude Roux